Mount Guanyin, Mount Kwan-in, or Kwaninshan is an inactive volcanic mountain in Wugu District, New Taipei City, Taiwan.

Name
The volcano is named after the feminine Bodhisattva of Compassion Guanyin.

Geology
The mountain is an inactive volcano with a height of 616 meters.

Facilities
There are nine hiking trails on the mountain for hikers to climb.

See also
 List of tourist attractions in Taiwan
 List of mountains in Taiwan

References

Extinct volcanoes
Guanyin
Landforms of New Taipei
Guanyin
Tourist attractions in New Taipei
Mountaineering in Taiwan